Dhupa (धुप) is, in Indian religions (such as Hinduism, Buddhism, Jainism, etc.), the ritual offering of incense during puja to an image of a deity, or other object of veneration. It is also the Sanskrit word for incense or perfume itself.

The Thai language also borrows this word from Sanskrit to call joss sticks or incense sticks, by omitting "a" in the word Dhupa. So, the word retains the Sanskrit form when it is written in the Thai alphabet as "Dhup" (ธูป). However, Sanskrit's  is pronounced as an aspirated  in Thai so that the word is normally pronounced or transliterated as "Thup". Incense burning before images, in temples and during prayer practice is also found in many parts of Asia, among followers of Jainism, Sikhism, Buddhism and Taoism.

The very idea of offering dhupa is personified in the dakini Dhupa, who is said in the Bardo Thödol to appear on the third day.

See also

 Añjali Mudrā
 Buddhist prayer beads
 Coconut: use for worship
 Culture of India
 Guru-shishya tradition
 Hindu prayer beads
 Hindu temple
 Incense of India
 Indian honorifics
 Mala
 List of Hindu festivals, many of which involve Puja
 Mudras
 Namaste
 Panchalinga Darshana
 Pranāma
 Puja (Buddhism)
 Puja (Hinduism)
 Pādodaka
 Satyanarayan Puja
 The Archaeology of Hindu Ritual

References

Objects used in Hindu worship
Puja (Hinduism)
Sanskrit words and phrases